Alopecia neoplastica may present as a scarring alopecia, appearing anywhere on the scalp, and it has been described with cutaneous metastasis from breast, gastric, lung, renal and pancreatic carcinomas.

See also 
 Alopecia areata
 List of cutaneous conditions

References 

Conditions of the skin appendages